Viola vallicola, the sagebrush violet, yellow sagebrush violet or valley violet, is a perennial plant in the Violet family (Violaceae).  It is native to Western and Central North America.

Varieties of sagebrush violet include: 
Viola vallicola A. Nelson var. major (Hook.) Fabijan
Viola vallicola A. Nelson var. vallicola

References

vallicola
Flora of North Dakota
Flora of South Dakota
Flora of Kansas
Flora of Montana
Flora of Wyoming
Flora of Colorado
Flora of Western Canada
Flora without expected TNC conservation status